The men's 5000 metres walk event  at the 1988 European Athletics Indoor Championships was held on 6 March.

Results

References

Racewalking at the European Athletics Indoor Championships
3000